Khana Darreh-ye Sofla (also Romanized as Khanā Darreh-ye Soflá and Khenā Darreh-ye Soflá; also known as Khenadarah, Khenā Darreh Pā’īn, and Khenā Darreh-ye Pā’īn) is a village in Hendudur Rural District, Sarband District, Shazand County, Markazi Province, Iran. At the 2006 census, its population was 118, in 30 families.

References 

Populated places in Shazand County